This is a list of areas of chaos terrain officially named by the International Astronomical Union on the planet Mars. Chaos terrain (or chaotic terrain) is an astrogeological term used to denote planetary surface areas where features such as ridges, cracks, and plains appear jumbled and enmeshed with one another. Coordinates are in planetocentric latitude with east longitude.

Areas of chaos terrain are usually named after a nearby albedo feature as in line with the IAU's rules on planetary nomenclature. Such an albedo feature must feature on the maps of Mars made by either Giovanni Schiaparelli or Eugène Michel Antoniadi and are listed at Classical albedo features on Mars.

References

This list was adapted from the public domain Gazetteer of Planetary Nomenclature, courtesy of the United States Geological Survey.

Surface features of Mars